Smiths Falls railway station in Smiths Falls, Ontario, Canada is served by Via Rail Corridor trains running between Toronto and Ottawa. It is unstaffed, with outdoor parking, telephones and washrooms. Accessible parking, automatic doors and wheelchair access is available to the platform. However, as of June 2020 no wheelchair lift is available for boarding or disembarking trains at the station.

22 surface lot parking spaces are managed by Indigo Parking. A pay meter is located inside the station; hourly, daily and monthly rates are available.

Railway services
As of September 2020, Smiths Falls station is served by 1 domestic route (with connections) provided by Via Rail, the primary passenger rail operator in Canada. Departures have been reduced to 5 trains per day due to the coronavirus pandemic (effective September 1, 2020).

Toronto - Ottawa

Ottawa - Toronto

 No local service between Ottawa and Fallowfield, or Guildwood and Toronto.

Stations

CPR station
The original passenger station building was built by Canadian Pacific Railway in 1887.  In 1999 the Smiths Falls Community Theatre began renovations on the station, installing the 140 seat Station Theatre into the old restaurant area.  A small waiting area in the building was used by Via Rail until the new Via Rail station opened.

CNoR station
As Smiths Falls is a junction between multiple rail lines, it once had multiple active passenger stations. A 1912 Canadian Northern Ontario Railway station on a now-abandoned line (Canadian National embargoed their Smiths Falls Subdivision between Smiths Falls and Strathcona in 1979) is now a National Historic Site which houses the Railway Museum of Eastern Ontario.

New station
On March 8, 2010, Via Rail announced plans to build and relocate to a new station located just north of downtown. The new station would have a distinctive tower. The new station would reduce scheduling conflicts between passenger and freight trains as the old station is located in the middle of a junction between two busy Canadian Pacific Railway lines and both the Via Rail's Smiths Falls and Brockville Subdivisions.

References

Further reading

External links

 Smiths Falls Station Build

Via Rail stations in Ontario
Railway stations in Canada opened in 1887
Canadian Pacific Railway stations in Ontario
Smiths Falls